The tea-drinking habits of Hong Kong residents derive from Chinese tea culture, primarily the Cantonese traditions such as yum cha. After more than 150 years of British rule, however, they have changed somewhat to become unique in the world. This uniqueness is not only in terms of the tea itself, but also in terms of the underlying social and cultural values.

The history of teahouses in Hong Kong 

The first teahouse in Hong Kong was established at the end of the 19th century. At that time people bought tea leaves from tea houses so that they could serve tea to visiting guests. Tea would be brewed at the beginning of the day and would be served as guests arrived during the day. At night, the remaining tea would be poured away.  They did this whether or not visitors actually arrived. This gave rise to the idiom "Tea is for pouring away."

In contemporary society, Hong Kong people buy tea at teahouses not only for serving their guests, but also for themselves.

The packaging of tea leaves in Hong Kong 

Tea-house staff used to store tea leaves in a large, foil container, then weigh them and pack them with papers and a plastic bag. This type of packaging would negatively affect the quality of the tea leaves as they would oxidise quickly, thereby losing their aroma. The packaging of tea leaves has greatly improved since then. Now tea leaves are vacuum-packed in high density plastic packs with fancy packaging. Not only is the quality raised, but the market value of the tea is also increased.

However, this only applies to non-fermented or semi-fermented teas (such as green or oolong teas). For fermented tea, like black tea, it is not recommended that plastic wares be used as the tea should be allowed to continue to oxidise and mature.

The "tea pocket" trend 
Fast and convenient without losing the original taste, the tea pocket is changing the domestic habit of tea drinking in Hong Kong.

"Tea pockets", also known as tea bags, have in recent years been used in Chinese tea. Initially they could be found in the supermarket, but were not popular as they were not well-publicised and not very attractively packaged.  As earlier with tea leaves, there has been an increase of well-packaged tea bags with any number of varieties of tea leave contained within. Most modern packages can be resealed so as to keep the tea dry. One of the brands has even made an inspiring design of the tea pocket that it gives the tea pocket a tetrahedral (pyramid-like) shape which allows more volume for larger sized tea leaves to expand and impart their flavor.

Special habit of tea drinking in Hong Kong – "morning tea and newspaper" 

Hong Kong is a place with plenty of night life. In contrast, streets are almost empty from seven to eight in the morning. Most shops open at or after nine o'clock in the morning, where Cantonese restaurants open at about six or even earlier (restaurants in the Western District open at about 4:00a.m.). The working class of Hong Kong usually have breakfast in these Cantonese restaurants in the early morning. They enjoy 一盅兩件 (Lit. One bowl with two pieces, meaning a cup of tea with two Dim sums) and they read newspapers in the morning before they go to work. Many elderly people bring their caged birds to the restaurants and chat with others. They can spend a whole morning by doing this.

Special Hong Kong style tea – milk tea 
The unique taste of Hong Kong milk tea is a blend of strong Ceylon black tea with other teas mixed with milk.

Flagstaff House Museum of Tea Ware 
The Flagstaff House Museum of Tea Ware is a branch museum of Hong Kong Museum of Art, located centrally in Hong Kong Park. It is a place for collecting, studying and displaying tea ware and holding regular presentation or demonstration lectures to promote Chinese tea drinking culture. Many famous Yixing teapots are exhibited in the museum.

See also
Taiwanese tea culture

External links
Hong Kong Tea Company
Flagstaff House Museum of Tea Ware
Hong Kong: Tea and Tea Houses

Chinese tea culture
Culture of Hong Kong